The 2019 Navotas Clutch season is the 2nd season of the franchise in the Maharlika Pilipinas Basketball League (MPBL).

Current roster

Datu Cup

Standings

Game log

|- style="background:#bfb;"
| 1
| June 16
| Pasay
| W 83–75
| Levi Hernandez (26)
| Rey Publico (9)
| Joe Allen Trinidad (5)
| San Andres Sports Complex
| 1–0
|- style="background:#bfb;"
| 2
| June 27
| Caloocan
| W 59–55
| Levi Hernandez (15)
| Rey Publico (10)
| Rey Publico (4)
| Bataan People's Center
| 2–0

|- style="background:#;"
| 3
| July 
| 
| 
| 
| 
| 
| 
| 2–1
|- style="background:#;"
| 4
| July 
| 
| 
| 
| 
| 
| 
| 2–2
|- style="background:#;"
| 5
| July 28
| Muntinlupa
| L 98–101 (OT)
| 
| 
| 
| Navotas Sports Complex
| 2–3

References

Manila Stars Season, 2018